Minor Hotels is an international hotel owner, operator and investor from Bangkok, Thailand with more than 550 hotels in 55 countries across Asia-Pacific, the Middle East, Africa, the Indian Ocean, Europe and the Americas. The hotel group operates as a subsidiary of Minor International PCL, one of the largest hospitality and leisure companies in the Asia Pacific region. The group operates hotels under the brands of Anantara Hotels, Resorts & Spas, Avani Hotels & Resorts, NH Hotels, NH Collection, nhow Hotels, Tivoli Hotels & Resorts, Oaks Hotels & Resorts and Elewana Collection.

History 
American-born Thai businessman William Heinecke founded the hotel group in 1978 with opening of the Royal Garden Resort in Pattaya (later rebranded as the Pattaya Marriott Resort & Spa).

The first property of the group's brand, Anantara Hotels, Resorts, & Spas, opened in the Thai seaside town of Hua Hin in 2001.

The brand celebrated its 20th anniversary on 4 March 2021 and has more than 40 hotels and resorts across Asia, Africa, the Middle East, Indian Ocean and Europe. (22)

In 2018, Minor acquired NH Hotel Group comprising some 380 hotels, mostly in Europe and Latin America.

Anantara Hotels, Resorts & Spas 
Anantara was founded in 2001 with the first luxury property in Thailand's seaside town of Hua Hin. Today, the operational portfolio includes more than 40 properties globally in Cambodia, China, Indonesia, Ireland, Italy, Malaysia, Maldives, Mauritius, Mozambique, Oman, Portugal, Qatar, Spain, Sri Lanka, Thailand, Tunisia, United Arab Emirates, Vietnam and Zambia.

Avani Hotels & Resorts 
The sister brand of Anantara, Avani Hotels & Resorts, was launched in 2011, and operate more than 30 properties in Australia, Botswana, Cambodia, Indonesia, Korea, Laos, Lesotho, Malaysia, Mozambique, Namibia, New Zealand, Portugal, Seychelles, Sri Lanka, Thailand, the United Arab Emirates, Vietnam and Zambia.

Oaks Hotels & Resorts 
Minor Hotels completed its takeover of Australian-based Oaks Hotels and Resorts, Ltd in 2011. Oaks comprises more than 60 properties in Australia, New Zealand, the United Arab Emirates and Qatar. Minor Hotels now controls 54 percent of the Australian-based chain.

Tivoli Hotels & Resorts 
In 2016, Portugal saw its largest ever hotel deal when Minor Hotel Group acquired Tivoli Hotels & Resorts, a hotel chain that owns 16 properties across Portugal, Brazil and Qatar. The acquisition, which marked Minor Hotel's entry into Europe and Latin America, totaled €294.2 million.

Elewana Collection 
The Elewana Collection of 16 boutique lodges, camps and hotels is in Kenya and Tanzania..

NH Hotel Group 
Minor Hotels acquired a 94.1% stake of NH Hotel Group during the last quarter of 2018.

Under three brands, that range from mid to high end (NH Hotels, NH Collection and nhow), it operates over 360 hotels in 30 countries, primarily in Europe and South America. In August 2020, Minor Hotels announced the introduction of the NH Collection brand into the Australian market, with a newbuild Sydney CBD property set to rise on Wentworth Street, opening to guests in 2023.

The Wolseley 
Corbin & King is the owner of The Wolseley, the company is in turn owned by Minor Hotels. Jeremy King is the co-founder of Corbin & King (C&K). The winning auction bid by Minor Hotels was £60 million ($78.8m), resulting in end of Jeremy King's ownership.

Corporate activities 
 The Heinecke Foundation
 The Golden Triangle Asian Elephant Foundation
 The Mai Khao Turtle Foundation
 Green Growth 2050 Global Standard
 Anantara's 365 Days of Good Deeds
 Dollars For Deeds
Sustainable Straws

Latest projects 
 Minor Hotel Group to Open Malaysia's First Anantara Hotel In December
 Anantara Tozeur Resort Opens in Tunisia
 Anantara Hotels, Resorts & Spas Announces Mauritius Debut With The Upcoming Opening of Anantara Mauritius Resort
 Anantara Invites Guests To Immerse In Andalusian Charm With The Launch Of Anantara Villa Padierna Palace Benahavis Marbella Resort
 Avani Continues Its Australian Expansion
 Minor Hotels introduces SEEN Beach Club Samui
 Thai hotel group Minor extends overseas diversification
 Hemas and Minor Hotel Group introduce luxury brand, Anantara, to Sri Lanka
 Thai Minor International to invest more than $1 bln in hotels, fast food over 5 yrs 
 Minor signs twin Anantara and Avani hotels in Abu Dhabi

Future projects 
 Anantara To Debut In Ireland
 Avani Hotels Continues Expansion In Vietnam With Avani Doc Let Resort 
Avani Hotels and Resorts To Open Two Resorts In Krabi 
 Minor Hotels Introduces Avani and Oaks brands to Yangon, Myanmar 
 Anantara Grand Hotel Krasnapolsky Amsterdam, to be opened in Autumn 2021
 Avani To Open 10 New Hotels By The End Of 2022
 Anantara Mamucabo Bahia Resort Brazil, to be opening in 2025

Partnerships 
 In early 2021, Minor Hotels entered a strategic partnership with Funyard Hotels & Resorts to fuel its China expansion. Through its partnership with Funyard Hotels & Resorts, a core alliance enterprise of Country Garden Group, the hospitality group will be bringing Anantara, Avani, Oaks, Elewana, Tivoli and NH brands to mainland China, many of them for the first time
 Anantara Hotels, Resorts & Spas Announces Partnership With Siam Ocean Technology
 Anantara Announces Global Partnership With Verita Healthcare Group With Inaugural Health Centre At Anantara Riverside Bangkok Resort
 VLCC Ventures Into Global Wellness Tourism With Exclusive Global Ties-Up
 Minor Hotels Establishes Asian Institute of Hospitality Management in Academic Association with Les Roches Global Hospitality Education
 Minor International and Sun International Announce Strategic Partnership
 Minor Hotel Group Forms Strategic African Partnership With UAE's Rani Investment
 Global Giant Minor Renews Commitment To Sri Lanka Tourism
 Minor Hotel Group Announces Partnership With Emirates Skywards 
 Minor International Partners With Hemas To Acquire Kani Lanka Resort & Spa

References

External links
 

1978 establishments in Thailand
Companies based in Bangkok
Hospitality companies established in 1978
Hospitality companies of Thailand
Hotel chains
Minor International
Timeshare